Farid Behzadi Karimi (born 14 May 1989 in Shahreza, Esfahan, Iran) is an Iranian footballer who plays for Naft Masjed Soleyman in the Persian Gulf Pro League. He usually plays as a striker. He is an ethnic Qashqayi.

Club career
Karimi joined Saba Qom in 2012 after spending the previous year at Steel Azin. In summer of 2014 Karimi went to Tractor for conscription issues.

References

External links
 Farid Behzadi Karimi at Persian League

Living people
1989 births
Iranian footballers
Saba players
Nassaji Mazandaran players
Steel Azin F.C. players
Qashqai people
Tractor S.C. players
Persian Gulf Pro League players
Association football wingers